Rojisha Shahi Thakuri is a Nepalese model and actor. She was the winner of Miss Nepal Earth 2013. She represented Nepal in Miss Earth 2013 in the Philippines.

Filmography

References

External links
 Miss Nepal 2013 Profile
 Miss Nepal Official Website
 Rojisha's facebook!

Miss Nepal winners
Nepalese female models
Nepalese beauty pageant winners
Miss Earth 2013 contestants
1993 births
Living people
People from Lalitpur District, Nepal